Kherur is a village in Bhatar CD block in Bardhaman Sadar North subdivision of Purba Bardhaman district in the state of West Bengal, India with total 877 families residing.

History
Census 2011 Kherur Village Location Code or Village Code 319791. The village of Debpur is located in the Bhatar tehsil of Burdwan district in West Bengal, India.

Transport 

Population 
Debpur village, most of the villagers are from Schedule Caste (SC). Schedule Caste (SC) constitutes 41.71% while Schedule Tribe (ST) were 17.58% of total population in Debpur village.

Population and House Data

Healthcare
Nearest Rural Hospital at Bhatar (with 60 beds) is the main medical facility in Bhatar CD block. There are primary health centres.

School
DEBPUR B.G.S.F.P. SCHOOL.

References 

Villages in Purba Bardhaman district